Bhagirathi Maharana (born 20 March 1967) is a BJD Floor leader and currently the Vice president of Biju Sramika Samukhya (Ganjam Dist). He Is a well known Social worker in both Berhampur and Gopalpur. Bhagirathi Maharana recently nominated as a president of Ganjam Karigar Sangh. He is actively participate in many party (Biju Janata Dal) activity of Gopalpur constituency.

Positions
 Vice President Biju Sramika Samukhya, (Ganjam Dist): MARCH,  2018 in  present

References

External links
Bhagirathi Maharana on kanak news channel

1967 births
Living people
Biju Janata Dal politicians
People from Ganjam district